Franjo Džidić (born 25 October 1939) is a Bosnian retired professional football manager and former player.

He is inscribed in Zrinjski Mostar history as the manager who "brought" the first Bosnian Premier League title to the club. The victory was even more immense because it was won in the 2004–05 season, which marked the one hundredth anniversary of Zrinjski.

Playing career
Born in Mostar, Kingdom of Yugoslavia, present day Bosnia and Herzegovina, Džidić started playing football in 1955. His father was a miner and lived in a mining colony beside local team Velež Mostar's old stadium (today's "Old Veležovo" or "Old Playground", a neighborhood in the city of Mostar) and began to train in a football school of Velež.

In 1958, Džidić made his first appearance for the first team of Velež. He played for Velež until 1969, after which he joined Borac Čapljina where he remained for three seasons. He had some offers to go abroad, but decided to stay in Yugoslavia, where he remained until the end of his playing career.

In 1972, Džidić joined Mladost Lištica, today known as Široki Brijeg, on a player-manager type contract. Džidić ended his playing career and ultimately stepped down as manager in 1974.

Managerial career
Džidić became a manager after ending his playing career, working as a player-manager at Mladost Lištica, today known as Široki Brijeg, Lokomotiva Mostar and Borac Čapljina, after which for six years he was an assistant manager at Velež Mostar. He assisted Vukašin Višnjevac, Miloš Milutinović and Muhamed Mujić. With Milutinović he won the Yugoslav Cup in 1981, beating Željezničar in the final. One year Džidić was also a football instructor at the level of Bosnia and Herzegovina, and then went to Trebinje to manager Leotar.

He spent four years in Leotar, making remarkable success. Trebinje is enriched for football and created plenty of players who later earned a football reputation and knowledge. Basically he took the players from Mostar, who could not play in Velež and then gained prominence in Leotar. These were: Ibrahim Rahimić, Lučić, Ronćević and Stipe Jurić. After 4 years in Trebinje, Džidić left Leotar.

After Leotar, he went to Iskra Bugojno and spent two years there. Then he returned to the Velež team consisting of: Meho Kodro, Joško Popović, Igor Musa and so on. Džidić was also the last manager of Velež before the Bosnian War. 

After the war, he first went to, at the time, Croatian 1. HNL club Šibenik. After Šibenik, he did a half-season in Samobor, which was then in the 2. HNL, and then returned to Mostar. Then Džidić became manager of HNK Cim and won first place in the Second League of Herzeg-Bosnia, without losing a game. From Cim he went back to Široki Brijeg and in one season won two the First League of Herzeg-Bosnia. After that he was named manager of Zrinjski Mostar. 

Džidić for the first time led Zrinjski in the 1997–98 First League of Bosnia and Herzegovina play-offs. From the First League of Herzeg-Bosnia, Zrinjski and Široki Brijeg were put in two groups where they waited their respective opponents of each group, for Sarajevo and Čelik Zenica. Zrinjski in the final competition suffered two defeats and failed to qualify for the play-offs final. In 2003, Džidić came back to Zrinjski but shortly after got sacked due to poor results. 

In 2004, he once again came back to Zrinjski. That proved to be the right choice, since Džidić led the Zrinjski teem to win first place in the Bosnian Premier League in the 2004–05 season, with it going down in history as the first title in Zrinjski's history for the club's one hundredth anniversary.

After leaving Zrinjski, he worked as manager at Ljubuški and Redarstvenik Mostar. 

Džidić then decided to end his managerial career, working only as head of the youth football schools of, first Široki Brijeg, and then Zrinjski.

Honours

Manager
Široki Brijeg
First League of Herzeg-Bosnia: 1996–97

Zrinjski Mostar 
Bosnian Premier League: 2004–05

References

External links
Franjo Džidić at Zrinjski.info

1939 births
Living people
Sportspeople from Mostar
Croats of Bosnia and Herzegovina
Association football central defenders
Yugoslav footballers
FK Velež Mostar players
NK Široki Brijeg players
Yugoslav First League players
Yugoslav football managers
Bosnia and Herzegovina football managers
NK Široki Brijeg managers
FK Leotar managers
NK Iskra Bugojno managers
FK Velež Mostar managers
HNK Šibenik managers
HŠK Zrinjski managers
Yugoslav First League managers
Croatian Football League managers
Premier League of Bosnia and Herzegovina managers
Bosnia and Herzegovina expatriate football managers
Expatriate football managers in Croatia
Bosnia and Herzegovina expatriate sportspeople in Croatia